Koiak 21 - Coptic Calendar - Koiak 23

The twenty-second day of the Coptic month of Koiak, the fourth month of the Coptic year. On a common year, this day corresponds to December 18, of the Julian Calendar, and December 31, of the Gregorian Calendar. This day falls in the Coptic season of Peret, the season of emergence. This day falls in the Nativity Fast.

Commemorations

Saints 

 The martyrdom of Saint Pachum, and Saint Dalusham, his sister 
 The departure of Pope Anastasius, the 36th Patriarch of the See of Saint Mark

Other commemorations 

 The commemoration of the Honorable Archangel Gabriel, the Announcer

References 

Days of the Coptic calendar